Submission software is a category of computer software that allows its users to publish their products or websites over the Internet. This software is typically used by marketing professionals who work in online marketing. It represents an electronic solution for online marketing as opposed to offline (newspapers, street banners) or media (radio, television) marketing.

Usually these packages allow three types of submissions: automatic, semi-automatic and manual.

Types of submission software
 Software submission - allows to submit software products either through the use of PAD files or by filling the websites submission forms
 Article submission - submits articles to article directories or online magazines
 Website submission - submits website addresses to all kind of directories
 Press release submission - applications that allow users to submit press releases to PR websites
 RSS submission - submits RSS feeds to RSS publishing sites

References

See also
 Portable Application Description
 Search engine submission

Publishing software